Heys may refer to:

Prestwich Heys A.F.C., an English amateur football club 
Prior's Heys, an English civil parish

People with the surname
Howard Heys, English cryptographer 
Stephen Heys, English footballer